In mathematics, an algebra such as  has multiplication  whose associativity is well-defined on the nose. This means for any real numbers  we have
.
But, there are algebras  which are not necessarily associative, meaning if  then

in general. There is a notion of algebras, called -algebras, which still have a property on the multiplication which still acts like the first relation, meaning associativity holds, but only holds up to a homotopy, which is a way to say after an operation "compressing" the information in the algebra, the multiplication is associative. This means although we get something which looks like the second equation, the one of inequality, we actually get equality after "compressing" the information in the algebra.

The study of -algebras is a subset of homotopical algebra, where there is a homotopical notion of associative algebras through a differential graded algebra with a multiplication operation and a series of higher homotopies giving the failure for the multiplication to be associative. When looking at the underlying cohomology algebra , the map  should be an associative map. Their structure was originally discovered by Jim Stasheff while studying A∞-spaces, but this was interpreted as a purely algebraic structure later on. These are spaces equipped with maps that are associative only up to homotopy, and the A∞ structure keeps track of these homotopies, homotopies of homotopies, and so forth.

They are ubiquitous in homological mirror symmetry because of their necessity in defining the structure of the Fukaya category of D-branes on a Calabi–Yau manifold who have only a homotopy associative structure.

Definition

Definition 
For a fixed field  an -algebra is a -graded vector space

such that for  there exist degree , -linear maps

which satisfy a coherence condition:
,
where .

Understanding the coherence conditions 
The coherence conditions are easy to write down for low degreespgs 583–584.

d=1 
For  this is the condition that
,
Therefore  represents a differential.

d=2 
Unpacking the coherence condition for  gives the degree  map . In the sum there are the inequalities

Unpacking the coherence sum gives the relation
,
which when rewritten with
 and 
as the differential and multiplication, it is
,
which is the Leibniz rule for differential graded algebras.

d=3 
In this degree the associativity structure comes to light.

One of the inputs for the first three  maps are coboundaries since  is the differential, so on the cohomology algebra  these elements would all vanish since . This includes the final term  since it is also a coboundary, giving a zero element in the cohomology algebra.

d=4 and higher order terms 

In degree  the other terms can be written out as

This means the homotopy of elements, including one that's in the image of  minus the multiplication of elements where one is a homotopy input, differ by a boundary. For higher order , these middle terms can be seen how the middle maps  behave with respect to terms coming from the image of another higher homotopy map.

Diagrammatic interpretation of axioms 
There is a nice diagrammatic formalism of algebras which is described in Algebra+Homotopy=Operad explaining how to visually think about this higher homotopies. This intuition is encapsulated with the discussion above algebraically, but it is useful to visualize it as well.

Examples

Associative algebras 
Hence -algebras generalize associative algebras.

Differential graded algebras 
Using the structure theorem for minimal models, there is a canonical -structure on the graded cohomology algebra  which preserves the quasi-isomorphism structure of the original differential graded algebra. One common example of such dga's comes from the Koszul algebra arising from a regular sequence. This is an important result because it helps pave the way for the equivalence of homotopy categoriesof differential graded algebras and -algebras.

Cochain algebras of H-spaces 
One of the motivating examples of -algebras comes from the study of H-spaces. Whenever a topological space  is an H-space, its associated singular chain complex  has a canonical -algebra structure from its structure as an H-space.

Example with infinitely many non-trivial mi 
Even in this simple example there is a non-trivial -structure which gives differentials in all possible degrees. Define the differential  by

and for 

In degree , so for the multiplication map, we have

And in  the above relations give

When relating these equations to the failure for associativity, there exist non-zero terms. For example, the coherence conditions for  will give a non-trivial example where associativity doesn't hold on the nose. Note that in the cohomology algebra  we have only the degree  terms  since  is killed by the differential .

Properties

Transfer of A∞ structure 
One of the key properties of -algebras is their structure can be transferred to other algebraic objects given the correct hypotheses. An early rendition of this property was the following: Given an -algebra  and a homotopy equivalence of complexes
,

Structure

Minimal models and Kadeishvili's theorem 

One of the important structure theorems for -algebras is the existence and uniqueness of minimal models – which are defined as -algebras where the differential map  is zero. Taking the cohomology algebra  of an -algebra  from the differential , so as a graded algebra,
,
with multiplication map . It turns out this graded algebra can then canonically be equipped with an -structure,
,
which is unique up-to quasi-isomorphisms of -algebras. In fact, the statement is even stronger: there is a canonical -morphism
,
Note these higher products are given by the Massey product.

Motivation 
This theorem is very important for the study of differential graded algebras because they were originally introduced to study the homotopy theory of rings. Since the cohomology operation kills the homotopy information, and not every differential graded algebra is quasi-isomorphic to its cohomology algebra, information is lost by taking this operation. But, the minimal models let you recover the quasi-isomorphism class while still forgetting the differential. There is an analogous result for A∞-categories by Maxim Kontsevich and Yan Soibelman, giving an A∞-category structure on the cohomology category  of the dg-category consisting of cochain complexes of coherent sheaves on a non-singular variety  over a field  of characteristic  and morphisms given by the total complex of the Cech bi-complex of the differential graded sheaf pg 586-593.

Applications 
There are several applications of this theorem. In particular, given a dg-algebra, such as the de Rham algebra , or the Hochschild cohomology algebra, they can be equipped with an -structure.

Massey structure from DGA's 
Given a differential graded algebra  its minimal model as an -algebra  is constructed using the Massey products. That is,

,
where
.
Hence all such -enrichments on the cohomology algebra are related to one another.

Graded algebras from its ext algebra 
Another structure theorem is the reconstruction of an algebra from its ext algebra. Given a connected graded algebra
,
it is canonically an associative algebra. There is an associated algebra, called its Ext algebra, defined as
,
where multiplication is given by the Yoneda product. This identification is important because it gives a way to show that all derived categories are derived affine, meaning they are isomorphic the derived category of some algebra.

See also 
 A∞-category
 Associahedron
 Mirror symmetry conjecture
Homological mirror symmetry
Homotopy Lie algebra
Derived algebraic geometry

References 

 — Original paper linking  structures to Mirror symmetry

Algebra
Homotopical algebra
Homological algebra
Algebraic geometry
Homotopy theory